Anti-Albanian sentiment or Albanophobia is discrimination, prejudice, or racism towards Albanians as an ethnic group, described primarily in countries with a large Albanian population as immigrants, seen throughout Europe.

A similar term used with the same denotation is anti-albanianism used in many sources similarly with albanophobia, although its similarities and/or differences are not defined.

Its opposite is Albanophilia.

History

Albanophobia in the 19th century

In 1889, Spiridon Gopčević published an ethnographic study titled Old Serbia and Macedonia that was a Serbian nationalist book on Kosovo and Macedonia and contained a pro-Serbian ethnographic map of Macedonia. Gopčević's biographer argues that he did not actually go to Kosovo and the study is not based on authentic experiences. Within scholarship, Gopčević's study has been noted for its plagiarisms, manipulations and misrepresentations, especially overstressing the Serbian character of Macedonia. Gopčević's views on Serbian and Albanian populations in Kosovo and also the issue of the Arnautaš theory or Albanians of alleged Serbian (descent) have only been partially examined by some authors. Noted for being an ardent Serbian nationalist, his book Old Serbia and Macedonia is seen as a work that opened the path for unprecedented Serbian territorial claims in the region.

The Expulsion of the Albanians was a lecture presented by the Yugoslav historian Vaso Čubrilović (1897–1990) on 7 March 1937.

20th century

A series of massacres of Albanians in the Balkan Wars were committed by the Montenegrin Army, Serbian Army and paramilitaries, according to international reports. During the First Balkan War of 1912–13, Serbia and Montenegro during the war with the Ottoman forces (many Albanians were among the Ottoman forces) and after expelling the official Ottoman Empire's forces in present-day Albania and Kosovo - committed numerous war crimes against the Albanian population, which were reported by the European, American and Serbian opposition press. Most of the crimes happened between October 1912 and summer of 1913. The goal of the forced expulsions and massacres of ethnic Albanians was statistic manipulation before the London Ambassadors Conference which was to decide on the new Balkan borders. According to contemporary accounts, between 20,000 and 25,000 Albanians were killed or died because of hunger and cold during that period. Most of the victims were children, women and old people and were part of a warfare of extermination. Aside from massacres, civilians had their lips and noses severed.

Origins and forms
The term "Albanophobia" was coined by Anna Triandafyllidou in a report analysis called Racism and Cultural Diversity in the Mass Media published in 2002. Although, the first recorded usage of the term comes from 1982 in The South Slav journal, Volume 8 by Albanian author Arshi Pipa. The report by Triandafyllidou represented Albanian migrants in Greece.

In countries

Greece 
In Greece, the sentiment has existed mainly post-1990s, when many immigrants escaped from Albania to Greece. The stereotype by some in Greece of Albanians as criminal and degenerate has been subject of a 2001 study by the International Helsinki Federation for Human Rights (IHFHR) and by the European Monitoring Centre on Racism and Xenophobia (EUMC). As of 2003, it was considered that prejudices and mistreatment of Albanians are still present in Greece, but as of 2007 it was observed that such sentiments are gradually receding. According to a 2002 statement of the IHFUR, the Albanians are more likely to be killed law enforcement officials than Romani people. In addition, the EUMC singles out ethnic Albanians as principal targets of racism. Furthermore, the EUMC found that undocumented Albanian migrants "experience serious discrimination in employment, particularly with respect to the payment of wages and social security contributions". Albanians are often pejoratively named and or called by Greeks as "Turks", represented in the expression "Turkalvanoi". Albanians in Greece are also classified in terms as "savage", while the Greeks view themselves as "civilized".

Prejudicial representations of Albanians and Albanian criminality by the Greek media is largely responsible for the social construction of negative stereotypes, in contrast to the commonly held belief that Greek society is neither xenophobic nor racist. Anti-Albanian sentiment in Greece is more of a Greek media product, rather than a reflection of social and political attitudes. Although the Greek media have largely abandoned their negative stereotyping of Albanian immigrants (since c. 2000), public perception had already been negatively influenced.

In March 2010, during an official military parade in Athens, Greek soldiers chanted "They are Skopians, they are Albanians, they are Turks we will make new clothes out of their skins". The Civil Protection Ministry of Greece reacted to this by suspending the coast guard officer who was in charge of the parade unit, and pledged to take tough action against the unit's members.

Albanophobia in Greece is primarily due to post-communist migration as well as the fact that until the mid 2000s, Albanians formed the primary immigrant population. Historically, when the anti-Albanian sentiment did occur it was primarily political due to Albania's ties with Ottoman Turkey.

Italy 
Albanophobia in Italy is primarily related to the Albanian immigrants mainly young adults who are stereotypically seen as criminals, drug dealers and rapists. Italian media provide a lot of space and attention to crimes committed by ethnic Albanians, even those just presumed. 

After the Albanian crisis and subsequent Albanian mass migration to Italy, it was observed that Italian public opinion was "solidly and remarkably" anti-Albanian. In the 21st century, anti-Albanian sentiment remains widespread and prevalent in Italian society. Some authors have noted the contrast Italians' general Albanophobia with Albanians' general Italophilia.

Switzerland 
Not infrequently, the Albanian diaspora in Switzerland is affected by xenophobia and racism. Integration difficulties and some criminal offences of some Albanians caused many Swiss to be prejudiced against Albanians, which has led to fear, hatred and insecurity.

Political parties that publicly oppose excessive immigration and the conservatism of traditional Swiss culture - in particular the Swiss People's Party (SVP) - strengthen this negative attitude among many party supporters. These parties have already launched a number of popular initiatives, which were referred to by the Albanians as discriminatory. In 1998, the Zurich SVP created an election poster with the words "Kosovo Albanians" and "No" in large letters when it came to financing an integration project for Albanians. In 2009, the Swiss People's Initiative "Against the Construction of Minarets" was adopted by the Swiss people. Many Muslim Albanians were outraged by this result and expressed their rejection. In 2010, the so-called "expulsion initiative" followed, which was also adopted by the voters. According to the law, foreigners who have committed serious crimes should be expelled from the country. The initiative on foreigners crime should thus reduce the crime rate and make the naturalization of foreigners more difficult. The "Sheep's Poster" designed by the SVP attracted international attention and was again described by many immigrant organisations in Switzerland as discriminatory.

Economic integration continues to present difficulties for Albanians in Switzerland. In October 2018, Kosovo's unemployment rate was 7.0% and in Macedonia population 5.3%, well above the figure for the rest of the permanent resident population. A study by the Federal Office for Migration justifies this with in part low vocational qualifications among the older generation and the reservations that Albanian youth are exposed to when entering the world of work. In the 1990s, many well-qualified Albanians, because of unrecognized diplomas, with jobs such as in construction or in the catering trade, in which the unemployment is generally higher. This also has implications for the social assistance rate, which is higher for ethnic Albanians, with significant differences depending on the country of origin. The most affected are people from Albania. In contrast, the number of students of Albanian descent is increasing today. In 2008, only 67 people were enrolled at Swiss universities, there are already 460 in 2017. Albanologists and migration researchers today assume that the integration and assimilation of Albanians are slowly increasing.

In its annual report, Amnesty International stated in 2010 that the "anti-minaret initiative" stigmatized Albanian Muslims in Switzerland and increased racism in Switzerland in general

Montenegro

By 1942, the city of Bar became a home to many Serbians. Many of these joined the Partisan forces and participated in their activities at Bar. The Bar massacre was the killings of an unknown number of mostly ethnic Albanians  from Kosovo  Yugoslav Partisans in late March or early April 1945 in Bar, a municipality in Montenegro, at the end of World War II.

The victims were Albanian recruits from Kosovo, who had been pressed by the Yugoslav Partisans into service. These men were then assembled in Prizren and marched on foot in three columns to Bar where they were supposed to receive short training and then sent off to the front. The march took the rugged mountain ranges of Kosovo and Montenegro to reach its destination. Upon arrival locals reported that these men, who had marched a considerable distance, were "exhausted" and "distressed". The column of men which stretched a few kilometres was then gathered on the Barsko Polje. At one point, in Polje, one of the Albanians from the column attacked and killed one of the Yugoslav officers, Božo Dabanović. Very soon after that somebody from the column threw a smuggled bomb at the commander of the brigade. This created a panic among the Partisans. The guards watching over the recruits then fired into the crowd killing many and prompting the survivors to flee into the surrounding mountains. In another case, several hundred Albanians were herded into a tunnel, near Bar, which was subsequently sealed off so that all of those trapped within the tunnel were asphyxiated.

Yugoslav sources put the number of victims at 400 while Albanian sources put the figure at 2,000 killed in Bar alone. According to Croatian historian Ljubica Štefan, the Partisans killed 1,600 Albanians in Bar on 1 April after an incident at a fountain. There are also accounts claiming that the victims included young boys. Other sources cited that the killing started en route for no apparent reason and this was supported by the testimony of Zoi Themeli in his 1949 trial. Themeli was a collaborator who worked as an important official of the Sigurimi, the Communist Albanian secret police. After the massacre, the site was immediately covered in concrete by the Yugoslav communist regime and built an airport on top of the mass grave.

North Macedonia 
Ethnic tensions have simmered in North Macedonia since the end of an armed conflict in 2001, where the ethnic Albanian National Liberation Army attacked the security forces of North Macedonia with the goal of securing equal rights and autonomy for the ethnic Albanian minority.

The Macedonian Academy of Sciences and Arts was accused of Albanophobia in 2009 after it published its first encyclopedia in which was claimed that the Albanian endonym, Shqiptar, means "highlander" and is primarily used by other Balkan peoples to describe Albanians if used in South Slavic languages the endonym is considered derogatory by the Albanian community. The encyclopedia also claimed that the Albanians settled in the region in the 16th century. Distribution of the encyclopedia was ceased after a series of public protests.

In a terrorist act known as the Smilkovci lake killings, on 12 April 2012, five young ethnic Macedonian teenagers were shot dead by persons of ethnic Albanian origin. They were later found guilty and sentenced to life. This provoked anti-Albanian sentiment. 
On 16 April 2012, a protest against these attacks and demanding justice was held in Skopje. Some of the participants in the protests were chanting anti-Albanian slogans.

On 1 March 2013 in Skopje, a mob of ethnic Macedonians protested against the decision to appoint Talat Xhaferi, an ethnic Albanian politician, as Minister of Defence. The protest turned violent when the mob started hurling stones and also attacking Albanian bystanders and police officers alike. The police reported 3 injured civilians, five injured police officers and much damage to private property. Although the city hospital reported treating five heavily injured Albanian men, two of which are on Intensive-care unit. During this protest part of the mob burned the Albanian flag. A mob of Macedonian nationalists also stormed the Macedonian Parliament on 27 April 2017 in reaction to the election of Talat Xhaferi as Speaker of the Assembly, numerous were injured during the riot.

On the 108th anniversary of the Congress of Manastir the museum of the Albanian alphabet in Bitola was vandalized, and the windows and doors were broken. A poster with the words "Death to Albanians" and with the drawing of a lion cutting the heads of the Albanian double-headed eagle was placed on the front doors of the museum. One week after this incident, on the day of the Albanian Declaration of Independence graffiti with the same messages, as those of the previous week, were placed on the directorate of Pelister National Park.

Amongst the unemployed, Albanians are overrepresented. In public institutions as well as many private sectors they are underrepresented. They also face hidden discrimination by public officials. According to the United States' Country Report on Human Rights 2012 for Macedonia "certain ministries declined to share information about ethnic makeup of employees".

The same report also added:

Serbia 

The origins of anti-Albanian propaganda in Serbia started in the 19th century with claims made by Serbian state on territories that were about to be controlled by Albanians after the collapse of the Ottoman Empire. By the late nineteenth century, Albanians were being characterized by Serbian government officials as a "wild tribe" with "cruel instincts". Others from Serbia's intelligentsia such as the geographer Jovan Cvijić referred to Albanians as being "the most barbarous tribes of Europe". Whereas politician Vladan Đorđević described Albanians as "modern Troglodytes" and "prehumans, who slept in the trees" with still having "tails" in the nineteenth century.

Throughout the 1930s, a strong anti-Albanian sentiment existed in the country and solutions for the "Kosovo question" were put forward, and it involved large-scale deportation. These included Yugoslav-Turkish negotiations (1938) that outlined the removal of 40,000 Albanian families from the state to Turkey and another was a memorandum (1937) entitled The Expulsion of the Albanians written by a Serbian scholar Vaso Čubrilović (1897–1990). The document proposed methods for expelling Albanians that included creating a "psychosis" by bribing clergymen to encourage the Albanians to leave the country, enforcing the law to the letter, secretly razing Albanian inhabited villages, ruthless application of all police regulations, ruthless collection of taxes and the payment of all private and public debts, the requisitioning of all public and municipal pasture land, the cancellation of concessions, the withdrawal of permits to exercise an occupation, dismissal from government, the demolition of Albanian cemeteries and many other methods.

Aleksandar Ranković, the Yugoslav security chief, had a strong dislike of Albanians. Following the Second World War and until 1966, Ranković upheld Serbian control of Kosovo through repressive anti-Albanian policies.

According to historian Olivera Milosavljević, part of the modern intellectuals in Serbia wrote about Albanians mainly within the framework of stereotypes, regarding their "innate" hatred and desire for the destruction of Serbs, which was a product of their dominant characteristic of "primitivism" and "robbery". Beginning in the mid-1980s, words such as "genocide", "oppression", "robbery", and "rape" were used when referring to Albanians in speeches, so that any mention of Albanians as a national minority contained negative connotations.
 
During the end of the 1980s and the beginning of the 1990s, activities undertaken by Serbian officials in Kosovo have been described as albanophobic.

The Serbian media during Milošević's era was known to espouse Serb nationalism while promoting xenophobia toward the other ethnicities in Yugoslavia. Ethnic Albanians were commonly characterized in the media as anti-Yugoslav counter-revolutionaries, rapists, and a threat to the Serb nation. During the Kosovo War, Serbian forces continually discriminated Kosovo Albanians:

A 2011 survey in Serbia showed that 40% of the Serbian population would not like Albanians to live in Serbia, while 70% would not enter into a marriage with an Albanian individual. 

In 2012, Vuk Jeremić, Serbian  Minister of Foreign Affairs, while commenting on Twitter about the Kosovo dispute, compared Albanians to the "evil Orcs" from the movie The Hobbit. During 2017, amidst a background of political tension between Serbia and Kosovo, Serbian media engaged in warmongering and anti-Albanian sentiment by using ethnic slurs such as "Šiptar" in their coverage.

In 2018, the Belgrade Supreme Court acknowledged that the word "Šiptar" is racist and discriminatory towards Albanians. According to the court, "Šiptar" is a term that defines Albanians as racially inferior to Serbs. However, some Serbian politicians still claim that the word is just an Albanian word for Albanians.

Some of the Serbian ultranationalists also declare the Albanians - or at least the northern part of them, as "Brainwashed Serbs", despite the distinctive nature of the Albanian language and culture - regardless of the presence in them of common elements with those of the neighboring South Slavic peoples and the Greeks.

Derogatory terms
 German terms:
 Germany 
 Bergtürken ('mountain Turks') – used by German chancellor Otto von Bismarck in 1878, 10 June (three days before the Berlin Congress). Bismarck denied the existence of an Albanian nation.
 Turkalbaner ('Turco-Albanian', borrowed from Greek 'Turkoalvanós')
 The neutral terms are Albaner (m.) and Albanerin (f.).
 Switzerland (german-speaking region)
 Viereckchopf, Kantechopf ('Squarehead, Boxhead')  – slang, a derogatory term which is used in reference to Albanian immigrants, particularly Kosovo Albanians (or Ghegs). The term is associated with the allegedly square-shaped heads of Albanians. This ethnic slur was previously used (during World War II) in reference to the Nazis and their square-shaped heads.
 The neutral terms are Albaner (m.) and Albanerin (f.).
 Greek terms:
 Turkoalvanós (Turco-Albanian)
 The neutral terms are Αλβανός/Alvanós (m.), Αλβανή/Alvaní (f.) and Αλβανίδα/Alvanída (f.).
 Tourkalvanoí/Τουρκαλβανοί ('Turco-Albanian') – derogatory term for Albanian.
 Tourkotsámides/Τουρκοτσάμηδες ('Turco-Chams') – derogatory term for Cham Albanian (an Albanian from Chameria).
 The neutral term is Tsámides/Τσάμηδες (Chams).
 South-Slavic terms:
 Serbia/North Macedonia
 Šiptar/Шиптар (derogatory) (m.) and Šiptarka/Шиптарка (f.) – are derogatory terms for Albanians. Formed from their endonym Shqiptar which is used by Balkan Slavic ethnicities such as the Serbs and Macedonians and it carries pejorative meanings which classify a person as being somewhat backward or aggressive. The Albanian term 'Shqiptar' was originally borrowed into south-Slavic as Šćìpetār/Шћѝпета̄р (with a 'ć', now archaic form) and it wasn't considered offensive - unlike the term without 'ć' (Šiptar). Albanian terms for south-slavs are shqa, shkja; which were borrowed from Late Latin sclavus or Sclavus.
 The neutral terms are Albanac/Албaнац (m., srb-cro); Albanec/Албанец (m., mac.) and Albanka/Албанка (f.).

See also
 Turco-Albanians
 Discrimination
 Racism
 Xenophobia
 Islamophobia

References

Sources

External links
 Treatment of ethnic Albanians in Greece  (UNHCR)
 Stephanie Schwandner-Sievers: Albanians, Albanianism and the strategic subversion of stereotypes
 Italy's Conflicted Responses to Albanian Immigration and Lamerica's Transitive Historical Consciousness
 Italophilia Meets Albanophobia
 USA Today - Anti-racism rally held after deadly soccer game
 Olivera Milosavljević: Stereotipi srpskih intelektualaca XX veka o Albancima (Serbian)
The Expulsion of the Albanians: Memorandum

 
Albanophobia
Discrimination in Greece
Anti-national sentiment
Racism